Jared Palmer and Richey Reneberg were the defending champions but only Reneberg competed that year with Jim Grabb.

Grabb and Reneberg lost in the first round to Brian MacPhie and Mark Philippoussis.

Mark Knowles and Daniel Nestor won in the final 7–6, 1–6, 6–4 against Todd Woodbridge and Mark Woodforde.

Seeds
Champion seeds are indicated in bold text while text in italics indicates the round in which those seeds were eliminated. All eight seeded teams received byes to the second round.

Draw

Final

Top half

Bottom half

References
 1996 Kroger St. Jude International Doubles Draw

U.S. National Indoor Championships
1996 ATP Tour